The following is a list of notable alumni of Lawrenceville School, a coeducational, independent college preparatory boarding school located in the historic Lawrenceville section of Lawrence Township, New Jersey.



A
 George Akerlof (born 1940; class of 1958), Nobel laureate for Economics
 Knowlton Ames (class of 1886), All-American football player at Princeton and head football coach at Purdue University
 Garth Ancier (born 1957), President of the WB Network
 A. Piatt Andrew (class of 1889), Assistant Secretary of the Treasury (1910–1912) and U.S. Congressman from Massachusetts
 Walter Gresham Andrews (1889–1949; class of 1908), United States House of Representatives from New York (1889–1943)

B
 David Baird Jr. (1881–1955; class of 1899), U.S. Senator from New Jersey
 Dewey F. Bartlett (1919–1979; class of 1938), former Governor of Oklahoma and member of the United States Senate
 Dierks Bentley (born 1975; class of 1993), country music singer
 Bill Berkson (class of 1957), poet
 Barton Biggs (1932–2012; class of 1951), former Morgan Stanley Chief Global Strategist; current money manager running Traxis Partners
 Thomas Pickens Brady (1903–1973; class of 1923), jurist, segregationist, Associate Justice of the Mississippi Supreme Court
 Suleiman Braimoh (born 1989), Nigerian-American basketball player in the Israel Basketball Premier League
 George Houston Brown (1810–1865), represented  in the United States House of Representatives, 1853–1855
 Frederick Buechner (born 1926; class of 1943), novelist
 Dennis Bushyhead (1826–1898; class of 1843), Principal Chief of the Cherokee Nation
 Fox Butterfield (born 1939; class of 1957), Pulitzer Prize-winning journalist for The New York Times

C
 Jay Carney (born 1965; class of 1983), 29th White House Press Secretary; former Time Washington Bureau Chief; former White House correspondent
 Charles Chaplin Jr. (1925–1968), actor; son of Charlie Chaplin
 Sydney Chaplin (1926–2009), actor; son of Charlie Chaplin
 Korawad Chearavanont (class of 2012), entrepreneur; grandson of Dhanin Chearavanont
 John Cobb Cooper (1887–1967), jurist and airline executive
 Merian C. Cooper (1893–1973; class of 1911), film director best known for King Kong (1933)

D
 Alan D'Andrea (class of 1974), cancer researcher and the Alvan T. and Viola D. Fuller American Cancer Society Professor of Radiation Oncology at Harvard Medical School
 Richard Dean (1956–2006), fashion and advertising photographer, model, and former player in Canadian Football League
 Frederick B. Deknatel (1905–1973; class of 1924), art historian
 William Adams Delano (1874–1960), architect
 Christopher DeMuth (born 1946; class of 1964), President of the American Enterprise Institute
 William T. Doyle (born 1926), member of the Vermont Senate from the Washington Vermont Senate District, 1969–2017, the longest-serving state legislator in Vermont history
 Barrows Dunham (1905–1995; class of 1922), author and former Head of Philosophy Department at Temple University in Philadelphia

E
 Michael Eisner (born 1942; class of 1960), former CEO of The Walt Disney Company

F
 Turki bin Faisal Al Saud (born 1945; class of 1963), Saudi Arabia's ambassador to United States
 Jane Ferguson (born 1984, class of 2004, journalist
 Maurice Ferré (born 1935; class of 1953), former Mayor of the city of Miami (1973–1985)
 Major Sir Hamish Forbes (1916–2007; class of 1934), British Army officer who served in the Welsh Guards during World War II; POW decorated for numerous escape attempts
 Malcolm Forbes (1919–1990; class of 1937), publisher of Forbes magazine
 Clint Frank (1915–1992; class of 1934), winner of the 1937 Heisman Trophy and Maxwell Award; Team Captain and All-American football player at Yale University
 Charles Fried (born 1935; class of 1952), Harvard Law School professor and former United States Solicitor General
 N. Howell Furman (1892–1965), professor of analytical chemistry who helped develop the electrochemical uranium separation process as part of the Manhattan Project

G
 George Gallup Jr. (1930–2011; class of 1948), pollster and author
 Roy Geronemus (1958–2013; class of 1971), physician and Chairman of the Board of the New York Stem Cell Foundation
 Robert F. Goheen (1919–2008; class of 1936), 16th President of Princeton University and former United States Ambassador to India
 Billy Granville (class of 1992), former Cincinnati Bengals player
 John Cleve Green (1800–1875; class of 1816), merchant
 Samuel D. Gross (1805–1884; attended 1822–1825), academic trauma surgeon
 Peter Johnson Gulick (1796–1877; class of 1822), pioneer Protestant missionary to Hawaii (1828–74) with the American Board of Commissioners for Foreign Missions; patriarch of the missionary-rich (1820s to 1960s) Gulick clan; co-founder of Princeton University's Philadelphian Society of Nassau Hall (1825–1930); spiritual parent to today's Princeton Christian Fellowship)
 William Stryker Gummere (class of 1867), captain of the Princeton football team; Chief Justice of the Supreme Court of New Jersey
 John Gutfreund (born 1929; class of 1947), former CEO of Salomon Brothers

H
 Richard Halliburton (1900–1939; class of 1917), author, adventurer
 Karen Hao (class of 2011), award-winning journalist
 Randolph Apperson Hearst (1915-2000; class of 1934), former chairman of the Hearst Corporation and son of William Randolph Hearst
 Lydia Hearst-Shaw (born 1984; class of 2002), model, daughter of Patricia Hearst
 Lars Hernquist (class of 1973), theoretical astrophysicist and Mallinckrodt Professor of Astrophysics at the Harvard-Smithsonian Center for Astrophysics
 Armond Hill (class of 1972), former NBA player, current assistant coach for the Boston Celtics
 Walter E. Hussman, Jr. (class of 1964), newspaper publisher and chief executive officer of WEHCO Media, Inc.
 Glenn Hutchins (class of 1973), co-founder, Silver Lake Partners

I
 John N. Irwin II (1913–2000), U.S. diplomat and attorney

J
 Owen Johnson (1878–1952; class of 1895), author of Lawrenceville Stories
 Rupert Johnson Jr. (class of 1958), vice chairman of Franklin Resources

K
 Joe Kyrillos (born 1960), politician who served in the New Jersey General Assembly, 1988–1992 and the New Jersey Senate, 1992–2018

L
 Duke Lacroix (born 1993; class of 2011), professional soccer player who plays as a forward for Indy Eleven in the North American Soccer League
 Butler Lampson (born 1943; class of 1960), computer scientist; 1992 Turing Award winner
 Mort Landsberg (1919–1970), NFL player
 William M. Lanning (class of 1866), U.S. Representative from New Jersey (1903–1904)
 Preston Lea (attended 1859–1860), Governor of Delaware (1905–1909)
 Aldo Leopold (1887–1948; class of 1905), father of ecology; author of A Sand County Almanac
 Huey Lewis (born 1950 as Hugh Cregg; class of 1967), musician
 Alexander S. Lilley (class of 1888), first football coach of the Ohio State Buckeyes
 Ashley Lyle (class of 1998), Emmy Award-nominated showrunner, creator of Yellowjackets

M
 John Van Antwerp MacMurray (born 1881; class of 1898), diplomat
 Ricardo Maduro (born 1946; class of 1963), former President of Honduras
 Joseph Moncure March (1899–1977), poet
 Reginald Marsh (1898–1954), painter
 William H. Masters (1915-2001; class of 1934), human sexuality researcher and co-founder of the Masters & Johnson Institute
 Donald C. McGraw (1897–1974; class of 1917), former President of McGraw-Hill Companies
 Harold McGraw Jr. (1918-2010; class of 1936), former CEO of The McGraw Hill Companies, Inc
 James M. McIntosh (1828–1862; attended 1837–1840), brigadier general in the Confederate States Army
 John Baillie McIntosh (1829–1888; attended 1837–1840), brigadier general in the Union Army
 James Merrill (1926–1995; class of 1943), poet
 Dennis Michie (1870–1898; class of 1888), first football head coach at Army, namesake of Michie Stadium
 Clement Woodnutt Miller (1916–1962), U.S. Representative from California
 Chi Modu (1966-2021), photographer known for his photos of various pioneering hip-hop music entertainers.
 Paul Moravec (born 1957), 2004 Pulitzer Prize for Music-winning composer
 Geoff Morrell (class of 1987), former Press Secretary of the Department of Defense
 Paul Mott (born 1958), retired professional soccer player for the Tampa Bay Rowdies, sports consultant and former professional sports executive
 Patrick Erin Murphy (born 1983; class of 2002), Congressman (D-FL), representing Florida's 18th Congressional District

N
 Joakim Noah (born 1985; class of 2004), basketball player for the Chicago Bulls

O
 Jarvis Offutt (1894–1918; class of 1913), World War I aviator, namesake of Offutt Air Force Base
 Charles Smith Olden (1799–1876; attended 1810–1814), 19th Governor of New Jersey, 1860–1863
 A. Dayton Oliphant (1887–1963), Associate Justice of the New Jersey Supreme Court 1945–1946, and again 1948–1957

P
 Arthur W. Page (1883–1960), public relations pioneer
 Joel Parker (1816–1888; attended 1834–1837), 20th Governor of New Jersey, 1863–66 and 1871–74
 Horace Porter (1837–1921; class of 1854), Union Army Brigadier General who was awarded the Medal of Honor
 Rodman M. Price (1816–1894; attended 1834–1837), represented  in the United States House of Representatives 1851–1853; 17th Governor of New Jersey 1854–1857

Q

R
 Jim Rash (born 1970; class of 1990), actor; winner of the 2012 Oscar for best adapted screenplay (The Descendants); Craig "Dean" Pelton on NBC's Community
 Andrew Horatio Reeder (attended 1822–1825), first Governor of the Kansas Territory (1854–55)
 Laurence A. Rickels (born 1954), theorist and philosopher, known for his work on vampires, the devil, technology and science fiction
 William P. Ross (1820–1891; attended 1837–40), Principal Chief of the Cherokee Nation
 Bob Ryan (born 1946; class of 1964), sportswriter for The Boston Globe; ESPN analyst and contributor

S
 Bobby Sanguinetti (born 1988; class of 2006), professional ice hockey defenseman for HC Lugano in the National League; left school after his sophomore year after being selected in the 2006 NHL Entry Draft
 Julian Larcombe Schley (class of 1898), Governor of the Panama Canal Zone (1932–1936)
 Paul Schmidtberger '82, author of Design Flaws of the Human Condition
 Gene Scott (1937–2006; class of 1956), tennis player and founder of Tennis Week magazine
 Hugh L. Scott (1853–1934; class of 1869), Chief of Staff of the United States Army and Superintendent of the United States Military Academy (West Point)
 Charles Scribner I (attended 1834–1837), publisher and founder of Charles Scribner's Sons
 Chip Smith (class of 1986), businessman, political strategist
 Cotter Smith (born 1949; class of 1968), actor
 Sheridan Snyder (class of 1954), biotechnology entrepreneur and philanthropist
 Fred Mustard Stewart (1932–2007; class of 1950), novelist
 William H. Stovall (1895–1970; class of 1913), World War I flying ace; World War II veteran; businessman
 Bandar bin Sultan (born 1945), Saudi Arabia's ambassador to the United States 1983-2005

T
 Brandon Tartikoff (1949–1997; class of 1966), former NBC programming chief
 Henry J. Taylor (1902–1984; class of 1920), journalist, author, and United States Ambassador to Switzerland 1957–1961 
 Buddy Temple (born 1942), lumber magnate and former politician from Lufkin, Texas
 Taki Theodoracopulos (born 1936), international journalist
 Randall Thompson (1899–1984), music composer and director of the Curtis Institute 1939–1941
 Samuel Huston Thompson (1875–1966), chair of the Federal Trade Commission
 Joseph Tsai (born 1964; class of 1982), Vice Chairman of Alibaba Group

U

V

W
 Frederic C. Walcott (1869–1949; class of 1886), U.S. Senator from Connecticut (1929–1935)
 Rawleigh Warner Jr. (1921–2013) , former president and CEO of Mobil
 Lowell Weicker (born 1931; class of 1949), former Governor of Connecticut and United States Senator
 Alex Westlund (born 1975), retired professional ice hockey goaltender who has since been a coach
 Meredith Whitney (born 1969; class of 1988), former research analyst at Oppenheimer
 J. Harvie Wilkinson III (born 1944), United States Court of Appeals, Fourth Circuit
 Brian Willison (born 1977; class of 1995), businessman
 Alfred Alexander Woodhull (class of 1852), Brigadier General and Army surgeon
 J. Butler Wright (1877–1939; class of 1895), diplomat; U.S. representative in Hungary, Uruguay, Czechoslovakia and Cuba

X

Y
 Welly Yang (class of 1990), actor
 Monica Yunus (class of 1995), operatic soprano in the Metropolitan Opera

Z

References

Lists of American people by school affiliation
Lists of people by educational affiliation in New Jersey